Pitcairnia colimensis is a plant species in the genus Pitcairnia. This species is endemic to Mexico.

References

colimensis
Endemic flora of Mexico
Plants described in 1969